Amandine Dulon (born 22 March 1982) is a French retired tennis player.

During her career, she won one singles title and three doubles titles on the ITF Women's Circuit. In the Grand Slam tournaments she achieved her best results reaching the first round in singles and doubles at the 2003 French Open.

ITF Circuit finals

Singles (1–1)

Doubles (3–1)

References

External links
 
 

1982 births
Living people
French female tennis players